This is a list of hypermarket chains sorted alphabetically by continent and country. A hypermarket is a superstore carrying a wide range of products under one roof, and theoretically allows customers to satisfy all their shopping needs in one trip.

Africa

Algeria

The Algerian chain Ardis (owned by Algerian group Arcofina) is currently operating one hypermarket in the country in Mohammadia, just outside Algiers. In the future Ardis will open 19 hypermarkets in the country; the next will open near Oran in Bir El Djir. Carrefour ended their partnership with the Algerian group Arcofina on February 19, 2009. "The concept of mass distribution does not work in Algeria," added Carrefour. Before that, Carrefour had still only one store opened as of 2009 of 18 hypermarkets planned by 2012. The private group Arcofina explained that there was a delay because of difficulties in finding available land for hypermarkets. Arcofina is now focusing on opening hypermarkets in the future under the Ardis brand.

 Ardis
 Carrefour (defunct, but returned in 2015)
 Cevital

Angola
 KERO

Benin
 Erevan (Système U)

Côte d'Ivoire
 Carrefour

Egypt
 Carrefour
 Spinneys
 LuLu Hypermarket

Gabon
 Géant – Mbolo

Kenya
 Carrefour
 Game
 Naivas
 Nakumatt
 Tuskys
 Uchumi

Mauritius
 Hyper U
 Shoprite

Mayotte
 Cora
 Super U

Morocco
There are several hypermarkets operating in the country. The biggest are Marjane, Aswak Assalam and Carrefour. The Acima brand, which belongs to the same retail group with Marjane, are stores that cannot qualify as hypermarkets because they are smaller.
 Aswak Assalam
 Carrefour
 Marjane

Reunion
 Carrefour
 Cora
 Géant Casino
 Hyper U

Rwanda
 Nakumatt
 Simba Supermarket
 T2000

South Africa
The Pick n Pay Stores chain uses the term for 14 of their largest stores in South Africa. Checkers also runs 24 hypermarkets under the "Checkers Hyper" name.
 Checkers Hyper
 Choppies
 Game
 Makro (Metro Cash & Carry)
 Pick 'n Pay Hypermarket
 ShopriteHyper
 Superspar
 USave Superstore

Tunisia
 Auchan – scheduled to open in 2012
 Carrefour
 Géant

Zimbabwe
 Spar Megastore

Asia

Armenia
 Carrefour

Bangladesh
 AEON
 Keells
 Lotte Mart
 Lulu  Hypermarket
 Spinneys

Bahrain

 Al Muntazah
 Carrefour
 Géant
 Lulu Hypermarket

Brunei
 Giant Hypermarket

Cambodia
 AEON
 Boeung Trabek Plaza: Open-Air Grocery & Fresh Produce Market
 Lucky Supermarket by Dairy Farm International Holdings 
 Global House Cambodia
 Makro Cambodia

China, People's Republic of

 Auchan
 Carrefour
 Hualian
 JUSCO
 Walmart
 Wumart

Defunct
 Tesco

Georgia

 Carrefour
 Goodwill Hypermarket
 Agrohub
 Fresco
 Spar Hypermarket

Hong Kong
There were some hypermarkets owned by Carrefour, which were closed down by 2000.

As of July 2011, there were five Æon JUSCO hypermarkets, 19 Wellcome superstores, and 43 PARKnSHOP superstores there.

 Æon
 JUSCO
 PARKnSHOP
 Wellcome superstores

Defunct chains
 Carrefour

French Polynesia
 Carrefour
 Géant

India

 D-Mart
 HyperCity
 Big Bazaar
 Lulu Hypermarket
 Reliance Fresh
 Reliance Smart
 More
 Spar Hypermarket
 Edumart Hypermarket
 Spencer's Hyper
 Star Bazaar

Defunct
Carrefour and Auchan had several hypermarkets, but both chains closed down all Indian stores in 2014 due to a financial crisis in owning European chains in that country. Auchan stores are planned to be sold to Spar Group and converted into Spar Hypermarkets as of 2016, while Carrefour stores are not yet sold to other chains.

Indonesia
 ÆON
 Hero
 Hypermart
 Lotte Mart
 LuLu Hypermarket
 Transmart

Iran

 Iran Hyper Star
 Padideh
 Proma Hypermarket
 Refah

Iraq
 Carrefour

Israel
The hypermarket format in Israel was not a success because retail chains abandoned hypermarkets and later converted them into smaller discount stores.
 Carrefour - Scheduled to open by late 2022
 Shufersal Big – not a hypermarket chain but currently has the largest stores

Japan

 ÆON
 Daiei
 Fuji
 Heiwado
 Ito-Yokado
 Izumi
 Nagasakiya
 SEIYU (Walmart)
 Sunlive
 Uny

Defunct
 Carrefour
 Tesco

Jordan

In Jordan, Carrefour has one branch in Amman (a joint venture between Majid Al Futtaim Group and Carrefour France) and has an area of 11,000 square meters. Hypermarkets also exist in the Zaatari refugee camp in Mafraq as part of the WFP initiative, which led the project to establish the stores.
 C-Town
 Carrefour
 Cozmo
 Spinneys
 Tazweed Center

Kazakhstan
 Kazmart DIY
 MEGA Astana
 Ramstore Hyper

Kuwait
The hypermarkets operating in Kuwait are Grand Hyper division Regency Group Dubai, which operates six hypermarkets in Kuwait, in Fahaheel, Watiya, Hawally, Jleeb al Shuwaikh, Khaithan and Hassawi, and two Grand Fresh mini supermarkets in Mangaf and Abuhalifa. Géant operates one hypermarket at 360 Mall, and six other supermarkets across the country, such as Carrefour and City Centre. The Sultan Center has 11 locations in Kuwait that target expatriate shoppers. CityCentre has two hypermarkets in Kuwait, in Shuwaikh and Salmiya. Carrefour has one hypermarket at The Avenues, in Shuwaikh, a few minutes out of downtown Kuwait City.

Lulu Hypermarket is the biggest hypermarket chain in GCC, and operates six outlets in Kuwait in Al Rai, Al Qurain, Al Dajeej, Salmiya, Egaila and Fahaheel.

Laos
 Big C

Lebanon
 Bou Khalil
 Carrefour
 Spinneys

Defunct brands
 Géant

Macau
 PARKnSHOP

Malaysia 

 AEON
 Giant Hypermarket
 Lulu Hypermarket
 Mydin Wholesale Hypermarket
NSK Trade City
 Servay Hypermarket (East Malaysia only)
 Lotus's (formerly known as Tesco)
 Econsave
 Sabasun HyperRuncit

Defunct:
 Carrefour – taken over by AEON BiG in 2012
 Makro – taken over by Tesco in 2007
 Tesco – taken over by Lotus's in 2021

Oman
 Carrefour
 Lulu Hypermarket

Pakistan
 Hyperstar (Carrefour)
 Metro
 Imtiaz supermarket

Philippines
 Puregold
 SM Hypermarket
 Super Metro

Qatar
 Carrefour
 Géant Casino
 Lulu Hypermarket

Saudi Arabia
 Al Danube
 Carrefour
 City Flower Hyper Markets
 Farm Superstores
 HyperPanda
 Lulu Hypermarket
 Tamimi Group
 Nesto Group

Singapore
 Big Box
 Cold Storage
 FairPrice Xtra
 Giant Hypermarket
 Sheng Siong

Defunct
 Carrefour (withdrew from the region in late 2012)

South Korea

The largest hypermarket chains are E-Mart (Shinsegae Group), Lotte Mart (Lotte) and Homeplus.

 Costco
 E-Mart
 GS Supermarket (GS Group)
 Homeplus
 Lotte Mart

Sri Lanka
 Cargills (Ceylon) PLC
 Keells Super
 Arpico Super Centre

Syria
 Grand Mart

Taiwan
 Carrefour
 Costco
 A.mart
 RT-Mart

Thailand

 Big C
 Makro
 Maxvalu Tokai
 Lotus's
 Tops Supermarket

Turkmenistan
The country's first hypermarket will be in a 100,000 square meter shopping center, in the capital Ashgabat, scheduled to open in 2014. The complex will include the hypermarket, offices, a cinema, boutiques and a parking lot that will accommodate around 1400 cars. It is yet unknown to which retailer Turkmenistan's first hypermarket will belong.

United Arab Emirates
 Carrefour
 Géant
 Lulu Hypermarket
 Nesto
 Spinneys

Vietnam

 ÆON
 Auchan
 Big C
 eMart
 Giant
 Lotte Mart
 Metro

Yemen
 Lulu Hypermarket

Europe

Albania

Defunct
 Carrefour – 1 hypermarket in Tirana
 Mercator – 1 hypermarket in Tirana

Andorra

 E.Leclerc
 Hiper Andorra
 Hiperpas

Austria

 Interspar
 Maximarkt (only in the Austrian states of Salzburg and Upper Austria)
 Merkur (Rewe Group)

Defunct
 Carrefour
 Magnet (Tengelmann Group)

Belarus
 Almi
 Bigzz
 Euroopt
 Gippo (Гиппо)
 Korona
 ProStore

Belgium

In the early 1960s, the first Superbazar (later Maxi GB and Bigg's) hypermarkets were created in Belgium in Auderghem, Anderlecht and Bruges.

In 2000, the French Carrefour Group took over the Belgian GB Group, all Maxi GB and Bigg's hypermarket stores were then rebranded Carrefour hypermarkets.

In 2007, there were 63 hypermarkets in the country. In May 2013, there were in total 67, of which were 45 regular Carrefour hypermarkets and 15 were new Carrefour Planet hypermarkets. The Louis Delhaize Group has seven Cora throughout Wallonia and Brussels.

The largest hypermarket in Belgium is the Cora store in Anderlecht (Brussels) with a size of 15 000 m2. The second largest is the Carrefour Planet store in the B-Park shopping center in Bruges (Flanders), which has a size of 14 000 m2.

 Carrefour
 Cora

Bosnia and Herzegovina

 Bingo
 Konzum
 Mercator
 Robot
 Tropic
 FIS

Defunct brands
 Drvopromet DP – renamed Mercator in 2011, then Konzum in 2014, and again Mercator in 2017
 Maxi – renamed Tropic in 2015
 VF-Komerc – renamed Konzum in 2007

Bulgaria

 HIT
 Kaufland

Croatia

 B-Hyper
 Emmezeta
 Interspar
 Kaufland
 Konzum
 Plodine

Defunct brands
 Hipermarketi Coop – renamed Interspar in 2010
 Getro
 Mercator – renamed Konzum in 2014

Cyprus

 AlphaMega
 Sklavenitis

Defunct
 Carrefour – purchased by Sklavenitis

Czech Republic

 Albert 
 Globus
 Kaufland
 Tesco

Defunct
 Carrefour – stores taken over by Tesco
 Interspar (Spar Group) – in 2015, stores taken over by Ahold and rebranded Albert

Denmark

Currently, Bilka is the biggest chain of hypermarkets (operated by Dansk Supermarked); the second biggest chain was Kvickly Xtra, which were converted in 2009 to the regular Kvickly supermarkets. Opening of new hypermarkets has decreased, as of 2010, due to restrictions on store sizes to protect the stores in city centers.
 Bilka

Estonia
 Maxima
 Prisma
 Rimi Hyper
 Selver

Finland

 K-Citymarket
 
 
 Prisma

Defunct

France

In France, hypermarkets are successful, and today, there are over 1000 hypermarkets in the country. Carrefour opened the first French and European hypermarket in 1963, in Sainte-Geneviève-des-Bois near Paris, and has 222 hypermarkets, as of 2013. The largest hypermarket in France is the Carrefour store in Villiers-en-Bière, Seine-et-Marne (77) in the Île-de-France region, with an area of 25 000 m2.

E.Leclerc opened its first hypermarket store in 1964 in Landerneau, near Brest, and is now the dominant hypermarket chain in France, with 489 hypermarkets. Internationally, the French Carrefour is still the largest hypermarket chain in terms of size, and second-largest (after Walmart) in terms of revenue.

The other chains with the most hypermarkets in France are Géant (120 hypermarkets), Auchan (134) and Hyper U (61).

In Corsica, hypermarkets are not as successful as in the rest of France; the only hypermarkets available in Corsica are Carrefour, Hyper U, E.Leclerc, Géant and Casino.

 Auchan
 Carrefour
 Cora
 E.Leclerc
 Géant
 Géant Discount
 Hyper U
 HyperCasino
 Intermarché Hyper
 Match
 Maxi Coop
 Migros MMM
 Record (Grosbliederstroff)

Defunct
 Continent – all became Carrefour in 2000
 Eroski
 Euromarché
 Hyper Cedico
 HyperChampion
 Mammouth – The first Mammouth store opened in 1969 near Troyes, and the last store closed in Lacroix-Saint-Ouen on 3 October 2009 after a 10-year delay to close the last store, as it was considered too small for an Auchan hypermarket, but too large for an ATAC supermarket.
 Rallye – first store opened in Brest in 1968; last closed in 2002
 Record – operated from 1967–2008; however there is a Record store still operating in Grosbliederstroff
 Rond Point
 Super Suma – became ATAC
 L'Univers

Germany

In Germany, the biggest hypermarket brands are Real (METRO AG), Kaufland (which belongs to Lidl), and Marktkauf (which is a brand of AVA, which in turn belongs to EDEKA). However, for various reasons, such as the strong competition by more focused discounters such as Aldi and Lidl, as well as legal restrictions on store size, pricing policy, and opening times, the hypermarket concept is not as widespread in Germany as in other countries.
 E-Center
 Famila
 Globus
 HIT
 Kaufland
 Marktkauf
 Plaza
 Real
 Rewe Center

Defunct
 Extra Future Store – first store opened in 2003 in Rheinberg; taken over by Real in 2008, which converted it to new Real Future Store hypermarkets
 Interspar – all stores were taken over by Wal-Mart in 1998
 Toom – rebranded to Rewe Center in 2014
 Wal-Mart – moved into Germany in 1997 by taking over Wertkauf stores, followed by Interspar stores the year after, but failed to use its American approach in Germany; in 2006 the remaining 85 hypermarkets were changed to Real hypermarkets.
 Wertkauf – first store opened in 1958 in Karlsruhe, its Munich store was the largest hypermarket in Europe when it opened in 1968; all stores were taken over by Wal-Mart in 1997

Greece

 Grand Masoutis
 Elephant
 Sklavenitis

Defunct
 Carrefour – bought by Sklavenitis

Hungary

The biggest hypermarket presence is Tesco. Other hypermarkets include Auchan, Metro (Cash & Carry) and InterSpar, which operate several hypermarkets in the country.
 Auchan
 Interspar
 Tesco

Defunct
 Cora (acquired by Auchan)

Iceland
 Bónus (supermarket only)
 Costco
 Hagkaup

Ireland

 Dunnes Stores
 Tesco Ireland (Tesco Extra stores)

Italy

In Italy and Italian-speaking parts of Switzerland, the term is ipermercati.

 Bennet
 Carrefour
 Conad Superstore / Conad Ipermercato
 Crai Superstore / Ipermercato Crai
 Esselunga Superstore
 Il Gigante
 Interspar / Iperspar
 Iper
 Ipercoop
 IperSimply (Auchan)
 Italmark
 PAM (Pam Superstore / Panorama and Superal)
 Sidis (Ipersidis, Sidis Superstore, Oasi, Migross Superstore, La Girandola, Decò Superstore, L'IperConveniente, MioMercato Superstore and Iper MioMercato)
 Sigma (Sigma Superstore / IperSigma and Ipersì Sigma)
 Sisa Superstore / IperSisa
 Super Spaccio Alimentare

Defunct
 Auchan City – sold to Coop Italia in 2017 and rebranded Ipercoop
 Billa Superstore – closed in 2013 and rebranded Conad and Carrefour
 CittàMercato – rebranded Auchan
 Cityper – rebranded IperSimply
 E.Leclerc – rebranded Conad in 2014 due to the end of the joint-venture between the two chains
 Euromercato – rebranded Carrefour
 IperAffi – owned only one hypermarket in Affi; rebranded IperOrvea in 2015
 IperCoopca – closed in 2015 due to Coopca's failure
 IperLeDune – rebranded Interspar in 2015
 IperPellicano – closed in 2013 due to Lombardini Holding's bankruptcy
 IperStanda – rebranded Billa Superstore in 2010
 Iperstore GS – rebranded Carrefour
 Megasidis – sold to Auchan in 2012 and then to Coop Italia in 2017

Kosovo
 ETC
 Maxi
 Viva

Latvia
 Maxima 
 Mego
 Rimi Hyper 
 Sky

Defunct
 Prisma

Lithuania

There are several hypermarkets, like the homegrown chain of Maxima supermarkets in Lithuania, which range in sizes from neighborhood convenience stores to giant supercenters or hypermarkets that stock over 65,000 SKUs. The chain has 499 (as of 2013) stores open throughout Lithuania, Latvia, Estonia, Bulgaria (branded as T-Market) and Poland (branded as Aldik Nova).

 Maxima
 Norfa
 Rimi Hyper

Defunct
 Prisma

Luxembourg
 Auchan
 Cactus
 Cora

Malta
 Pavi Supermarket (1 hypermarket)

Moldova
 Kaufland
 Nr 1

Monaco
 Carrefour (1 hypermarket)

Netherlands
In the Netherlands hypermarkets were not a success; there were several attempts of retailers like Ahold and SHV but they all eventually failed.

In 1971, Schuitema opened their first Dutch hypermarkets, Famila and Ahold with Miro in Vlissingen. In 1973, SHV Holdings opened Trefcenter. Shortly after, Maxis was created by De Bijenkorf. However, all these hypermarkets failed, and all closed in the 1980s.

In the late 1990s, the American chain A&P started operating supermarkets and several hypermarkets by taking over old Maxis stores. The A&P chain wasn't very successful. C1000 took over the stores in 2000–2003, and the hypermarkets were converted to C1000 supermarkets.

Since 2006, the German chain Famila (currently operating hypermarkets in the north of Germany and Italy) has tried to return in the Netherlands by opening a Dutch hypermarket in Emmen and then expanding in a few years to about 25 hypermarkets between 4,500 and 7,000 square meters. J. Bünting Beteiligungs AG from Leer (Germany) had therefore opened an office in Drachten. However, as of 2013 there were still no Famila stores in the country.

On March 27, 2013, the largest supermarket of the Netherlands was opened by Jumbo in the city of Breda, called Jumbo Foodmarkt. With around 6,000 square meters, this store can be considered a hypermarket, but does not offer non-food products, which is unlike most hypermarkets. The second Jumbo Foodmarkt will open with a size of 7,000 square meters in the unfinished Focus-U-Park shopping center of 30,000 square meters in Steenwijk. This store will sell non-food products, and will be the first real hypermarket in the Netherlands since 2000.

 Albert Heijn XL (2,800–4,500 m2)
 Jumbo Foodmarkt (6,000–8,000 m2)

Defunct brands
 A&P Hypermarkt
 Famila
 Maxis
 Miro
 Trefcenter

North Macedonia
Defunct
 Carrefour – 1 hypermarket closed in 2016

Norway
There are Coop Obs! owned by Coop Norge, which operates 24 hypermarkets through the country. Coop Norge also owns three Smart Club outlets (Warehouse club). Other hypermarkets include EuroSpar, a hypermarket brand of Spar, and ICA AB, with ICA Maxi stores.
 Coop Obs!

 Eurospar

 Smart Club
Defunct
 Kvickly Xtra (defunct since 2010; earlier known as Obs!)      
 ICA Maxi (defunct since 2012)

Poland

 Auchan
 bi1
 Carrefour
 E.Leclerc
 Kaufland
 Tesco

Defunct
 Real – acquired by Auchan in 2012

Portugal
In Portugal, there are a considerable number of hypermarket chains in operation, including Continente (the biggest and the first Portuguese chain to go international), Auchan, Pingo Doce, Lidl and Intermarché. Most of these chains also operate supermarkets and smaller stores.
 Auchan
 Continente (Sonae group)
 E.Leclerc
 Intermarché 
 Pingo Doce (Jerónimo Martins group)

Romania
 Auchan
 Carrefour
 Cora
 Kaufland

Defunct
 Real – acquired by Auchan in 2012

Russia
 Auchan (Ашан)
 Globus
 Karusel (Карусель)
 Lenta (Лента)
 Liniya (Линия)
 Magnit (Russia's largest retailer)
 Nash Hypermarket (Наш Гипермаркет)
 OK (О'Кей)
 Prisma
 Spar
 Vester (Вестер)

Defunct
 Real – acquired by Auchan in 2012

Serbia
 DIS
 Mercator
 Roda
 SuperVero (Veropoulos)
 Tempo Centar (Delhaize)

Defunct
 Tuš

Slovakia
 Hypernova
 Kaufland
 Tesco

Defunct
 Carrefour

Slovenia
 E.Leclerc
 Interspar (Spar Group)
 Mercator
 Tuš

Spain
 Alcampo (Auchan)
 Carrefour 
 E.Leclerc
 Eroski
 Hipercor

Defunct
 Continente – rebranded to Carrefour
 Sabeco – rebranded to Alcampo

Sweden
 City Gross
 Coop Forum
 ICA Maxi

Switzerland
There are currently two chains operating hypermarkets in the country. Coop Switzerland owns 13 hypermarkets throughout the West, with the biggest stores situated in Geneva and Fribourg. The Migros chain has 11 MMM hypermarkets, including some in Lausanne, Basel, and two in France which are both near Geneva, one in Thoiry and Étrembières.

Until 22 March 2013, Casino-Magro had several HyperCasino hypermarkets in Switzerland until the bankruptcy of the Magro group.

 Coop
 Migros (MMM)

Defunct
 Carrefour
 HyperCasino

Turkey
 Carrefour (acquired by Big C in Jan 2011)
 Migros Türk (5M MİGROS)
 Real
and many other local hypermarkets

Defunct
 Jusco (replaced by Max Value)

Ukraine
 Auchan
 Eko-Market
 Epicentr K
 Mega Market
 Novaya Linia
 Novus
 Velika Kishenia

Defunct
 Real – acquired by Auchan

United Kingdom

The largest chains in the UK are Tesco, Asda and Sainsbury's, which all operate hypermarkets in the country.

 Asda 
 Sainsbury's
 Tesco Extra
Defunct
 Carrefour – first Carrefour store opened in the 1970s; UK business was sold to Gateway/Somerfield in 1990 and later was sold to Asda
 Sainsbury's Savacentre – joint ventures between Sainsbury's and BHS, later rebranded Sainsbury's Superstores

North America

Canada
 Loblaw Companies owns and operates:
 Atlantic Superstore
 Real Canadian Superstore and in Quebec Maxi & Cie.
 NorthMart (in the territories and Labrador)
 Walmart Supercentre

Costa Rica
 Walmart

Dominican Republic
 Hipermercados Olé
 La Sirena
 Carrefour
 Jumbo

Honduras
 Walmart

Mexico
 Casa Ley
 Chedraui
 Soriana
 Walmex (Walmart)

Defunct
 Carrefour – all rebranded Walmart in early 2000s
 Comercial Mexicana – purchased by Soriana in 2016 and defunct by May 2018

Nicaragua
 PriceSmart
 Walmart

Panama

 PriceSmart

United States

Stores in the United States tend to be single-level enterprises with long operating hours; many of them, especially Walmart, are open 24 hours a day (except on certain holidays). The term "hypermarket" is not in general use in the US. Warehouse stores such as Costco and Sam's Club are popular alternatives to discount superstores (hypermarkets) for much the same shopping requirements, requiring an annual membership, purchase of larger sizes of packaged groceries, and a more limited selection of brands and styles.

 Fred Meyer – now a division of Kroger
 Kroger Marketplace
 Meijer
 Smith's Marketplace – nameplate for hypermarkets operated by another Kroger division, Smith's Food & Drug; in a 2004 corporate reorganization, Smith's took over the Utah operations of Fred Meyer
 SuperTarget
 Walmart Supercenter

Defunct
 American Fare – division of Kmart/Bruno's
 Auchan – tested in the Houston and Chicago areas; Houston stores closed in 2003
 bigg's – merged with Remke Markets and lost general merchandise section (see Remke Markets bigg's)
 Carrefour – opened hypermarkets in Philadelphia and Voorhees Township, New Jersey, in 1988 and 1992 respectively; both closed in 1993. Some associates wore roller skates to facilitate moving about the large building. The Voorhees location now houses a Kohl's department store, a Raymour & Flanigan furniture store, and a Marshall's discount clothing store. The Philadelphia location (an outparcel of the Philadelphia Mills mall) housed a Walmart discount store (formerly a Bradlees; moved to a Supercenter on the former Ports Of The World/Boscov's/Steve & Barry's site) and still houses Dick's Sporting Goods and Raymour & Flanigan.
 Fedco – membership department store chain, operated in Southern California from 1948 to 1999
 Gemco – division of Lucky Stores
 Harts Stores / Big Bear Plus – division of Big Bear Stores
 Hypermart USA – division of Wal-Mart
 Kmart Super Center – last location closed in April 2018 in Warren, Ohio
 Leedmark – a joint venture involving E.Leclerc of France; operated a single  store in Glen Burnie, Maryland from 1991 to 1994
 The Real Superstore – a division of the defunct National Tea Company, the former US subsidiary of the Canadian Loblaws chain, which runs The Real Canadian Superstore (see listings for Canada in the Canadian section)
 The Treasury
 Twin Valu – division of ShopKo/SuperValu

Oceania

Australia
The hypermarket concept was not a success in Australia. Coles Myer had their own hypermarkets in the country with the introduction of Super Kmart in 1983, until the results were not positive. The concept was eventually shelved by 1989 to then divide all Super Kmart stores to have a separate Coles supermarket and a separate Kmart discount department store.

In 1984 the South African retail chain Pick 'n Pay opened a hypermarket in the Brisbane suburb of Aspley. They had planned to expand to 10 hypermarkets however union bans imposed on South Africa by Australia at the time because of Apartheid prevented the other stores from opening. In 1995 the Australian branch of Pick 'n Pay was sold to Coles Myer and in late 2012 the Pick 'n Pay Hypermarket in Aspley would be closed and divided into an Aldi and Coles supermarkets as well as a Kmart discount department store.

Costco has stores in Brisbane, Melbourne, Sydney, Newcastle, Adelaide, Perth and Canberra.

Defunct
 Pick 'n Pay Hypermarket
 Super Kmart

New Zealand
In New Zealand, The Warehouse operated three hypermarkets in the North Island between 2006 and 2009 under the "Extra" banner. These stores were closed due to poor performance.

Defunct
The Warehouse Extra

South America

Argentina
 Carrefour
 Coto
 Dia
 Hipermercados Jumbo
 Walmart

Brazil
 Bompreço
 Carrefour
 CompreBem
 Extra Hipermercados
 Pão de açúcar
 Sendas
 Wal-Mart

Chile
 Jumbo
 Líder
 Tottus

Colombia
 Éxito
 Jumbo

Defunct
 Carrefour – rebranded Jumbo in 2012

French Guiana
 Carrefour
 Géant Casino

Paraguay
 Extra Hipermercados

Peru
 Plaza Vea (Intercorp)
 Tottus (Falabella)
 Vivanda (Intercorp)
 Wong (Metro)

Uruguay
 Géant

Venezuela
 Éxito

See also

 Big-box store
 List of superstores
 List of supermarket chains

References

 
Retailing-related lists